The 15th European Film Awards were presented on December 7, 2002 in Rome, Italy. The winners were selected by the members of the European Film Academy.

Awards

Best Film

References

External links 
 European Film Academy Archive

2002 film awards
European Film Awards ceremonies
2002 in Italian cinema
2002 in Europe